Mária Balla-Lantos (born 6 December 1944) is a Hungarian former backstroke swimmer. She competed at the 1964 Summer Olympics and the 1968 Summer Olympics.

References

External links

1944 births
Living people
Hungarian female backstroke swimmers
Olympic swimmers of Hungary
Swimmers at the 1964 Summer Olympics
Swimmers at the 1968 Summer Olympics
Universiade medalists in swimming
Universiade gold medalists for Hungary